Death cult may refer to:
Death cult, another name for mortuary cult
Death Cult, an early name for the British rock band The Cult
Death Cult (EP), a compilation album featuring all the songs from Death Cult

See also
Southeastern Ceremonial Complex, a regional stylistic similarity of artifacts, iconography, ceremonies, and mythology of the Mississippian culture also known as the "Southern Death Cult"
Southern Death Cult, a British post-punk/gothic rock band in the early 1980s
A synonym for the term destructive cult